The United States Progressive Party of 1948 was a left-wing political party in the United States that served as a vehicle for the campaign of Henry A. Wallace, a former vice president, to become President of the United States in 1948. The party sought racial desegregation, the establishment of a national health insurance system, an expansion of the welfare system, and the nationalization of the energy industry. The party also sought conciliation with the Soviet Union during the early stages of the Cold War.

Wallace had served as vice president under Franklin D. Roosevelt but was dropped from the Democratic ticket in 1944. Following the end of World War II, Wallace emerged as a prominent critic of President Harry S. Truman's Cold War policies. Wallace's supporters held the 1948 Progressive National Convention, which nominated a ticket consisting of Wallace and Democratic Senator Glen H. Taylor of Idaho. Despite challenges from Wallace, Republican nominee Thomas E. Dewey, and Strom Thurmond of the segregationist Dixiecrats, Truman won re-election in the 1948 election. Wallace won 2.4% of the vote, which was far less than the share received by Theodore Roosevelt and Robert La Follette, the presidential nominees of the 1912 and 1924 Progressive Party tickets, respectively. Neither of those parties was directly related to Wallace's party, though these parties did carry over ideological groups and influenced many members of the 1948 Progressive Party.

In 1950, at the outbreak of the Korean War, Wallace recanted his foreign policy views and became estranged from his former supporters. The party nominated attorney Vincent Hallinan to run for president in 1952, and Hallinan won 0.2% of the national popular vote. The party began to disband in 1955 as opponents of anti-Communism became increasingly unpopular, and was fully dissolved, with the exception of a few affiliated state Progressive Parties, by the late 1960s.

The Progressive Party of Henry Wallace was, and remains, controversial due to the issue of communist influence. The party served as a safe haven for communists, fellow travelers and anti-war liberals during the Second Red Scare. Prominent Progressive Party supporters included U.S. Representative Vito Marcantonio, writer Norman Mailer and, briefly, actress Ava Gardner.

Foundation

The formation of the Progressive Party began in 1946, after United States Secretary of Commerce and former Vice President and Secretary of Agriculture Henry A. Wallace was sacked in 1946 from the Truman administration having begun to publicly oppose Truman's policies. Calls for a third party had been growing even before Wallace, whom Franklin D. Roosevelt replaced as vice president with the more moderate Truman at the 1944 Democratic National Convention, left the Truman Administration.

Wallace dissented from the hard line that Truman was taking against the Soviet Union, a stance that won him favor among fellow travelers and others who were opposed to what became known as the Cold War. He received support from two major organizations, the National Citizens Political Action Committee (NCPAC) and the Independent Citizens Committee of the Arts, Sciences and Professions (ICCASP), political action committees (PACs) that had been created to support Roosevelt. These two organizations merged in December 1946 as the Progressive Citizens of America (PCA), which formed the backbone of the Progressive Party and Henry Wallace's bid for US president on  July 23–25, 1948, when the 1948 Progressive National Convention in Philadelphia launched a "New Party" to a crowd of enthusiastic liberal and left-leaning citizens. Carl Marzani's film of the convention, whose soundtrack consists of inspirational words and songs recorded elsewhere, shows both meetings leading up to the convention and the convention itself.

In her book School of Darkness (1954), Bella Dodd, an American Communist Party National Committee member who later left and went on to give anti-Communist testimony before Congress, wrote about a June 1947 Communist National Committee meeting she attended at which the founding of the 1948 Progressive Party was planned:
The point of it all came near the end, when [John] Gates read that a third party would be very effective in 1948, but only if we could get Henry Wallace to be its candidate.

There it was, plainly stated. The Communists were proposing a third party, a farmer-labor party, as a political maneuver for the 1948 elections. They were even picking the candidate.

When Gates had finished, I took the floor. I said that while I would not rule out the possibility of building a farmer-labor party, surely the decision to place a third party in 1948 should be based not on whether Henry Wallace would run, but on whether a third party would help meet the needs of workers and farmers in America. And if a third party were to participate in the 1948 elections, the decision should be made immediately by bona-fide labor and farmer groups, and not delayed until some secret and unknown persons made the decision.

My remarks were heard in icy silence. When I had finished, the committee with no answer to my objection simply went on to other work.

However, it was becoming evident that the top clique was having a hard time with this proposition. It was also clear that [Eugene] Dennis and his clique of smart boys were reserving to themselves the right to make the final decision, and that the Party in general was being kept pretty much in the dark.

Communist influence
In February 1948, two days before a special election put American Labor Party candidate Leo Isacson into Congress, The New York Times analyzed the shifting background of the Progressive Party:The question involved in the special election is how strongly the Labor [ALP] party vote will hold up after withdrawal of the Amalgamated Clothing Workers of America and other anti-Communist unions from the Labor party because of its support of Mr. Wallace's candidacy for President, which has left the Communists and other left-wing elements in complete control of that party's organization. 
More broadly, in the run-up to the presidential election, the Democrats nominated Harry Truman to run for a full term while New York Governor Thomas E. Dewey, who had lost to Roosevelt in 1944, was renominated by the Republican Party. Dewey had defeated the isolationist, non-interventionist senator Robert A. Taft of Ohio for the GOP nomination and favored an aggressive policy against the USSR.

The American Communist Party did not field a presidential candidate, and instead endorsed Wallace for President, given that the Cold War was beginning to gain momentum and with it the Red Scare and anti-Communist sentiment. This endorsement was to hinder Wallace far more than it would help him. When Wallace refused to expel Communists working in the party during the 1948 election, his campaign was severely criticized by both the firmly anti-Communist Truman and Dewey camps.

The former Communist National Committee member Bella Dodd asserts in School of Darkness that the Progressive Party of 1948 had Wallace as its voice and "inspirational leader" but was really controlled by top U.S. Communists, in particular William Z. Foster and Eugene Dennis, who filled the staff of the new party with people loyal to themselves and dictated self-defeating policies to the Progressive Party. Dodd concluded:The reason they wanted a small limited Progressive Party was because it was the only kind they could control. They wanted to control it because they wanted a political substitute for the Communist Party, which they expected would soon be made illegal. A limited and controlled Progressive Party would be a cover organization and a substitute for the Communist Party if the latter were outlawed.
Historians have disputed the degree to which Communists shaped the party. Most agree that Wallace paid very little attention to internal party affairs. Historians Schapsmeier and Schapsmeier argue (1970 p 181):
[The Progressive Party] stood for one thing and Wallace another. Actually the party organization was controlled from the outset by those representing the radical left and not liberalism per se. This made it extremely easy for Communists and fellow travelers to infiltrate into important positions within the party machinery. Once this happened, party stands began to resemble a party line. Campaign literature, speech materials, and campaign slogans sounded strangely like echoes of what Moscow wanted to hear. As if wearing moral blinkers, Wallace increasingly became an imperceptive ideologue. Words were uttered by Wallace that did not sound like him, and his performance took on a strange Jekyll and Hyde quality—one moment he was a peace protagonist and the next a propaganda parrot for the Kremlin.
One historian (further to the left than the Schapsmeiers) explores the internal dynamic (Schmidt 258–9):
 At one pole were the extreme leftists, three closely related groups—admitted Communists, past and present; the party-liners and fellow travelers who failed to differ noticeably with the Communists as to either policy or principle; and finally those non-Communists who, in … 1944–50 failed to take issue with the Communists on policy, but whose underlying principles seemingly differed.…
 In the middle were grouped an apparently large majority of Progressive Party followers—the moderates. Exemplified by both national candidates, these individuals were willing to accept Communist support, because they felt that it was inconsistent, in the light of their ideals, to oppose Redbaiting by others, yet attempt to read Communists out of the new party.
 At the right were arrayed those who, feeling that Communist support should have been disavowed in no uncertain terms, yet were unwilling to adopt the ADA tactic of violent attack on the Communists. This group would have approved making the Progressives "non-Communist" rather than "anti-Communist", excluding but not assailing the Reds. Most persons sharing this view had, like Max Lerner, completely avoided the party, but others like Rexford Guy Tugwell joined and stayed, if reluctantly, through the campaign.…
 In the period following 1948, party members were hounded by the House Unamerican Activities Committee, from job to job. Members found themselves fired from even the lowest of day labor jobs by FBI agents and others. Although historians point out that groups tended to leave the party in the order of their views from right to left, with most of the rightists departing during or shortly after the campaign, accompanied by many of the moderates. And the moderate defection, so marked following election day, 1948, becoming a nearly complete walkout in the summer of 1950, with the policy rift over Korea and Wallace's departure. Consequently, by the close of 1951 the few remaining portions of the Wallace Progressive Party were composed almost exclusively of the earlier extreme left group. These were the ones who had favored a "narrow" organization; after the Wallace break, they finally achieved this goal, with the departure of almost everyone else, this does not take into account the huge pressure to conform and stop the activism by HUAC and FBI. The fact that the member of congress defeated by Joe McCarthy was Robert La Follette Jr, as an irony not lost on these activists.

U.S. Senator Robert M. La Follette, Jr., whose father "Fighting Bob" La Follette had run for president on the Progressive Party ticket in 1924, had been head of the Wisconsin Progressive Party (which was not related to Wallace's party), though he had returned to the Republican fold by 1946. He lost to McCarthy in the Republican primary.

Orson Welles, a friend of Roosevelt who had endorsed him in the 1944 election, refused to be involved with Wallace's presidential campaign. Welles later described Wallace as "a prisoner of the [U.S.] Communist Party. He would never do anything to upset them."p. 66

Views

The slogan of the "New Party", and the name many used to refer to the party forming around Henry Wallace, was appropriately "Fight for Peace". A major drive for Henry Wallace had always been the ending of the hostile relations between the Soviet Union and the United States and the acceptance of Soviet influence in Europe. Wallace had first espoused such views in 1944, but before long they took a more dramatic tone, as a sense of urgency and anxiety for peace settled in with the beginning of the arms race and the Cold War. Yet, while the "New Party" may be best remembered for its anti-war, pro-Soviet relations, it sought to include a very broad range of issues and interests. Wallace, and many others in the party, sought to create something more than a single-issue party, to the objection of other leaders in the party who felt that would be their undoing. Nevertheless, the platform of the party and the range of issues it covered show the diversity of the people who formed the "New Party" in 1948, who included many socialists as well as Communists. Among the policies the Progressive Party hoped to implement were the end of all Jim Crow laws and segregation in the South, the advancement of women's rights, the continuation of many New Deal policies including national health insurance and unemployment benefits, the expansion of the welfare system, and the nationalization of the energy industry among others.

Support in New York from ALP

The American Labor Party (ALP) "formally organized itself as the New York branch of the Progressive Party."

The ALP also helped form a "New York State Wallace for President" conference, held on April 3, 1948. ALP leaders Isacson and Marcantonio both spoke there.

During the Progressive Party's convention in July 1948 in Philadelphia, Pennsylvania, the following committees had the following ALP members:
 Arrangements: Elinor Liebmann Gimbel (wife of Louis Gimbel, Jr.)
 Credentials: Leo Isacson, Charles Collins, Jose Lopez
 Nominations: Ada Jackson, Grace Liebman, Morris Pizer
 Rules:  Vito Marcantonio, Saul Mills, John Abt, Paul Kern
 Platform: Lee Pressman, Elinor Gimbel, W.E.B. Dubois, Estelle Osborne, Alfred Stern (husband of Martha Dodd), Mary Van Kleeck

Prominent supporters
Henry Wallace's bid for the presidency attracted the support of many prominent people in academia and the arts. Among those who publicly supported Wallace were Larry Adler, George Antheil, Marc Blitzstein, Kermit Bloomgarden, Morris Carnovsky, Lee J. Cobb, Aaron Copland, Howard da Silva, W. E. B. DuBois, Albert Einstein, Howard Fast, Ava Gardner, Uta Hagen, Dashiell Hammett, Lillian Hellman, Judy Holliday, Libby Holman, John Huston, Burl Ives, Sam Jaffe, Garson Kanin, Howard E. Koch, John Howard Lawson, Canada Lee, Norman Mailer, Albert Maltz, Thomas Mann, Lewis Milestone, Arthur Miller, Clifford Odets, Linus Pauling, S. J. Perelman, Anne Revere, Budd Schulberg, Adrian Scott, Artie Shaw, Philip Van Doren Stern, I. F. Stone, Louis Untermeyer, Mark Van Doren, and Frank Lloyd Wright.

Lawson, Maltz and Scott were members of the Hollywood Ten, members of the movie industry who were called before the House Un-American Activities Committee (HUAC) for suspected membership in the Communist Party. Many of Wallace's public supporters were similarly brought before HUAC and were blacklisted if they did not cooperate.

Election results
Running as peace candidates in the nascent Cold War era, the Wallace-Taylor ticket garnered no votes in the United States Electoral College and only 2.4% of the popular vote, a far smaller share than most pundits had anticipated; some historians have suggested that the Progressive campaign did Truman more good than harm, as their strident criticism of his foreign policy helped to undercut Republican claims that the administration's policies were insufficiently anti-Communist. Nearly half of these votes came in New York (possibly tipping the state and its 47 electoral votes from Truman to Dewey), where Wallace ran on the American Labor Party ballot line.

On September 11, 1948, for instance, the national committee of the Progressive Party passed a resolution which observed:
The totally unjustified decisions of the Illinois Electoral Board to rule the Progressive Party off the ballot is a clear violation of the most basic democratic concepts.

The decisions rob millions of the free citizens of Illinois of their right to vote for the Party and candidate of their choice. They force the war policies of the old parties down the throats of freedom and peace-loving Americans.

Free Americans cannot—and will not—tolerate stolen elections.
This reflects a growing move by states to limit ballot access by any candidate other than the Republican or Democratic party candidates.

The party at state level
In Massachusetts, the anti-war Progressive Party was active in 1948 and faced discrimination in this state also. On May 31, 1948, for instance, Mayor James Michael Curley of Boston, a Democrat, denied the use of the bandstand on the Boston Common to the Progressive Party of Massachusetts.  The following month, however, on June 29, one of the African-American leaders of the Progressive Party, Paul Robeson, was allowed to speak in the Crystal Ballroom in Boston's Hotel Bradford. In Virginia, in 1948, Virginia Foster Durr ran for the U.S. Senate seat on the Progressive ticket.

The party had 228,688 registered voters in New York and 22,461 in California.

Pop culture connection
One of the Kingston Trio's most popular folk songs in the 1950s, "The MTA Song", was written by supporters of the Progressive Party of Massachusetts' 1949 Boston mayoralty candidate, Walter A. O'Brien. After Boston's publicly funded MTA purchased the privately owned Boston Elevated Railway's subway and trolley system for $30 per share more than each share was worth, the MTA imposed a fare increase on the citizens of Boston. Progressive Party mayoral candidate O'Brien then led unusually large protests against the MTA fare increase before the 1949 mayoral election. But although his campaign's anti-fare increase song was subsequently turned into a national hit record in the 1950s, O'Brien failed to win the local Boston election in 1949. When the Kingston Trio decided to record "The MTA Song", it was apparently agreed to change the first name of the O'Brien referred to in the song from "Walter" to "George", because it was feared that a hit record which referred to "Walter O'Brien" would make it even more difficult than it already was for the former Progressive Party candidate to find a New England employer who was willing to hire him during the McCarthy Era.

Disbandment
After the 1948 election, Henry Wallace grew increasingly estranged from the Progressive Party. His speeches started to include mild criticism of Soviet foreign policy, which was anathema to many leftists in the party. The final break came in 1950, when the Progressive Party's executive committee issued a policy statement against US military involvement in Korea, and soundly rejected Wallace's proposed language criticizing the invasion by communist North Korea. Wallace came out in support of the US intervention in the Korean War, and quit the Progressive Party three weeks later.

In 1952, the Progressive Party ran lawyer Vincent Hallinan for president. Their vice presidential candidate was Charlotta Bass, the first African-American woman ever to run for national office. The campaign attracted little media attention and few votes, and was not even on the ballot in many states. Erstwhile Progressive candidate Henry A. Wallace supported General Dwight D. Eisenhower's presidential candidacy as a Republican and published an article in the September 7, 1952, issue of This Week magazine (a Sunday supplement that was included in 37 American newspapers) entitled "Where I Was Wrong," detailing some of his mistakes in not having opposed Joseph Stalin strenuously enough. The Progressive Party disbanded in 1955, as the Cold War dominated the political spectrum, and any party which had not taken an anti-Communist position was deemed to be unviable.

The 1948 Progressive Party is only tenuously connected to the original Progressive Party (1912–1932). Members of the 1948 Progressive Party, however, have joined the later state Progressive Parties, thus linking the 1948-1960s group to the Vermont Progressive Party, Wisconsin Progressive Party, Minnesota Progressive Party, California Progressive Party, Oregon Progressive Party, and Washington Progressive Party, as well as the Citizens Party of the 1980s and 90s.

Presidential tickets

See also
 Progressive Citizens of America (PCA)
 Progressive Party (United States, 1912)
 Progressive Party (United States, 1924)
 Jencks v. United States

References

Further reading and sources
 Busch, Andrew E. "Last Gasp: Henry A. Wallace and the End of the Popular Front” Reviews in American History 42#4 (2014), pp. 712–17. online

 Devine, Thomas W. The eclipse of Progressivism: Henry A. Wallace and the 1948 presidential election (The University of North Carolina Press, 2000). See online review

 
 Lovin, Hugh T. "New Deal Leftists, Henry Wallace and ‘Gideon’s Army,’ and the Progressive Party in Montana, 1937—1952" Great Plains Quarterly 43#4 (2012), pp. 273–86. online

  online

  Reviewed in  Three volumes:
v. 1. The components of the decision
v. 2. The decision and the organization
v. 3. The campaign and the vote

 
  online; also see online review

 
  online

Archives
 Records of the Progressive Party. Archive maintained by University of Iowa Libraries Special Collections Department. 1940 – 1969. This collection is apparently the material the MacDougall collected for writing his book Gideon's Army. Accessed May 29, 2006.

 George E. Rennar Papers. 1933–1972. 37.43 cubic feet. At the Labor Archives of Washington, University of Washington Libraries Special Collections. Contains materials about the Progressive Party organization in 1948.

Political parties established in 1948
 
Defunct democratic socialist parties in the United States
Communist Party USA mass organizations
Political schisms
Political parties in the United States
Left-wing populism in the United States